E. amseli may refer to:

 Edosa amseli, a fungus moth
 Elachista amseli, a grass-miner moth
 Emmelina amseli, a plume moth
 Euclasta amseli, a grass moth